Mayhem was a professional wrestling pay-per-view (PPV) event produced by World Championship Wrestling (WCW) in the month of November in 1999 and 2000. It replaced the promotion's November PPV event World War 3 which was held from 1995 to 1998 and is noted for being the first wrestling pay-per-view named after a video game, rather than the video game named after a pay-per-view.

Since 2001, the rights to the event are owned by WWE. In 2015, all WCW pay-per-views were made available on the WWE Network.

Dates, venues, and main events

References

 
Recurring events established in 1999
Recurring events disestablished in 2000